The Mgr. Ladeuzeplein is the largest square in the centre of Leuven, Flemish Brabant, Belgium. The square was named after a former rector of the Catholic University of Leuven, Mgr. Paulin Ladeuze. The central library of the Katholieke Universiteit Leuven (KU Leuven) is located on this square.

Toponymy
Among the local population the square was known as the Jerkarlisse. This name is derived from the Clarisse religious order who used to have a monastery at this location, when it still was a sandy hill (jer refers in the local dialect to dirt, thus unpaved, as contrary to the adjacent Stiënkarlisse, the former paved Graanmarkt, now the Herbert Hooverplein).

In 1783, the monastery was abolished and the city of Leuven bought the estate from the authorities, who had inherited it, in order to establish a market dedicated to the sale of wood. The hill was levelled off and the first house on the square was erected in 1812. At this time, the square was named the Place Napoleon ("Napoleon Square"). Later, it was renamed the Volksplaats ("People's Place"), before acquiring its current name after World War II.

University Library

The square is dominated visually by the monumental central library of the KU Leuven. Even though the neo-Renaissance exterior implies otherwise, the building is relatively recent, dating from 1921. The library was a gift from the American people to the city of Leuven, after the original 17th-century library near the Grote Markt was burned down by the German occupying forces in August 1914. The fire destroyed not only a large part of the cultural patrimony of the medieval city, but it also caused the loss of countless and irreplaceable historical manuscripts and books, many dating back centuries.

This act of violence caused uproar throughout the world and several, mostly American, charities were established to compensate the loss, so in 1921 work was begun to build a new library, on the square now known as Ladeuzeplein.  The new building also contains one of the largest carillons in Europe, it was created and offered as a gift in 1928, by US engineers as a monument of remembrance for all colleagues who lost their lives during World War I. The carillon originally contained 48 bells, that being the number of states in the Union at the time of the gift. The main bell, which rings every hour on the hour, is named the Liberty Bell of Louvain and the fourth largest bell contains an inscription calling for world peace.

In May 1940, in the first year of World War II, the German occupiers again destroyed, almost completely, the (new) University Library. After the war, the building was reconstructed almost completely along the original plans.  After a substantial renovation from 1999 to 2003, the exterior, carillon and roof structure are once again restored to their former beauty and dominate views of the square.

In January 2014, a permanent exhibit on these wartime events was installed over five floors of the bell tower.

Art
In 2005, the KU Leuven celebrated the 575th anniversary of the foundation of the Old University of Leuven, and decided to thank the city of Leuven for its hospitality by asking renowned artist Jan Fabre to create a fitting sculpture and present it as a gift to the city. Fabre designed a modern art installation called the Totem. According to the author, the juxtaposition of the surreal view of the "bug on a needle" in front of the neo-classical library building perfectly captures the spirit of the city and university of Leuven.

The ancient art of citywide musical recitals also still is very much alive. There are regular recitals carried out on the carillon, which was completely restored in 1983 and expanded to 63 bells.

Regular events
 Weekly Farmers' market on Friday
 Yearly cultural city wide exposition Leuven in Scene
 On Saturday and Sunday during the months of July and August, nightly carillon recitals Ladeuze Bells 
 Yearly carnival fair during the month of September
 Christmas fair in December

References

External links

 Totem van Jan Fabre - Dutch language site
 Leuven in Scene  - Dutch language site
 Ladeuze Bells  - Dutch language site
 Museum opened in Louvain's university library's bell tower - Dutch language site

Squares in Belgium
Buildings and structures in Leuven
Tourist attractions in Leuven
Bell towers in Belgium
Carillons